Hanina [Hananyah] Segan ha-Kohanim  (lit. "R. Hanina (Hananiah) [the] Segan (Deputy) Ha-Kohanim (High priest)") was of the first Generation of the Jewish Tanna sages. He was the father of Rabbi Simeon ben ha-Segan.

He lived during the destruction of Second Temple of Jerusalem, and had testified, following that event, on what he had seen occur during the destruction. The book "Yihusei Tanna'im ve-Amora'im" cites that he was killed along with Shimon ben Gamliel and Ishmael ben Elisha ha-Kohen. It is said that he was one of the Ten Martyrs, and was killed on the 25th of Sivan.

Hanina earned his title due to the role he fulfilled - as Deputy to the Kohen Gadol (High priest) in the Holy Temple of Jerusalem. Ha-Segan was a position with the responsibility of overseeing the actions of the work of the  Temple priest staff, as well as a stand-in position, ready to take the role of High priest in case he will be found unfit to serve the holy work on the temple. In that conjunction, Hanina was considered a "Segan Ha-Kohanim", only second to the High priest, as R. Hanina himself indicates: "R. Hanina the Segan of the priests said: Why a 'Segan' [Deputy] is ever appointed ? In case the high-priest became unfit for service, the 'Segan' [Deputy] should enter at once to do the service".

At his time, many High priests reshuffled, while he remained in his role, and for that reason, it is believed to be the possible reason he was named 'Segan ha-Kohanim' rather than the more common term used in the Gemara: 'Ha-Segan'.

See also
Segan

References

Mishnah rabbis
1st-century rabbis